Kendra Moyle (born September 17, 1990) is an American former competitive pair skater. With former partner Andy Seitz, she is the 2006 World Junior silver medalist and 2006 U.S. Junior national champion.

Career 
Early in her pairs career, Moyle skated with Reed Minney. She teamed up with Andy Seitz in February 2005. They won the 2006 U.S. Junior national title and went on win silver at the 2006 World Junior Championships. The pair skated on both the Junior Grand Prix and senior Grand Prix circuit in the 2006/2007 season. Moyle and Seitz announced the end of their partnership on April 4, 2007. Moyle teamed up with Steven Pottenger.

After retiring from competition, Moyle joined Disney on Ice.

Personal life 
Moyle became engaged to her pairs partner Steven Pottenger in May 2012. They were married on June 23, 2013.

Programs 
(with Seitz)

Competitive highlights

With Pottenger

With Seitz

References

External links

 
 Official site of Moyle/Seitz

1990 births
Living people
American female pair skaters
People from Chelsea, Michigan
World Junior Figure Skating Championships medalists
21st-century American women
20th-century American women